Maroñas–Parque Guaraní is a composite barrio (neighbourhood or district) of Montevideo.

Location
This barrio shares borders with Unión to the southwest, Villa Española to the west, Flor de Maroñas to the north, Las Canteras to the east and Malvín Norte to the south. It is a suburban area which has only one main street called Camino Maldonado. This street is surrounded by small businesses and is the main route to travel to some of the departments of Uruguay.

Images

See also 
Barrios of Montevideo

External links 
  (Spanish)
 Intendencia de Montevideo / Historia de Maroñas
 Revista Raices / Historia del barrio Maroñas
Article on the barrio, mentioning the location of Parque Guaraní
 Coordinates for Parque Guaraní:

Barrios of Montevideo